Orehovica is a small settlement south of Podnanos in the upper Vipava Valley in the Municipality of Vipava in the Littoral region of Slovenia.

Geography
Orehovica is a compact village in the valley of Dog Tail Creek, which starts at Vrhi below Lakovec Hill (591 m). Kunovec Creek, a left tributary, joins it in the settlement. The flat areas of the settlement are covered by meadows and fields, and vineyards cover the southern slope of the ridge above the valley. The forest in the settlement extends to Mount Nanos.

Name
The name Orehovica and names like it (e.g., Orehovec, Orehovci, Orehovlje, Orešje) are relatively common in Slovenia. It is derived from the common noun oreh 'walnut', thus referring to the local vegetation.

Church
A chapel of ease dedicated to the Trinity stands above the settlement. The church was consecrated in 1642. It contains a carved altar dating to the 18th century. The church was almost entirely rebuilt in 1987–1988, and was reconsecrated on 28 August 1988.

References

External links

Orehovica at Geopedia

Populated places in the Municipality of Vipava